North Ferriby Football Club is a football club based in North Ferriby in the Haltemprice area of the East Riding of Yorkshire, England.

History
North Ferriby United were wound up by the High Court in March 2019, with their 2018–19 season record in the Northern Premier League Premier Division expunged. North Ferriby F.C. were established as a replacement, playing at the previous club's Grange Lane ground. The club were recognised by the Football Association and entered the Northern Counties East League for the 2019–20 season.

Current squad

Records
Largest league attendance: 1,442 vs Harrogate Railway Athletic F.C., 23 April 2022, NCEL Division One Play Off Final.

Smallest league attendance: 150 vs many teams due to COVID-19 attendance restrictions during the 2020–21 NCEL Division One.

References

External links
 

2019 establishments in England
Association football clubs established in 2019
Football clubs in the East Riding of Yorkshire
Northern Counties East Football League
Phoenix clubs (association football)